ESKA is the eponymous debut album of British singer-songwriter Eska, released on 27 April 2015. The album was released in collaboration with Naim Records and Eska's own Earthling Recordings. It was shortlisted for the 2015 Mercury Music Prize.

Critical reception

Upon release, ESKA was received with generally positive reviews from critics. At Metacritic, which assigns a normalized rating out of 100 to reviews from critics, the album received an average score of 82, based on 5 reviews, indicating "generally favorable reviews". The Observer wrote that ESKA was a "mind-bending gem", offering particular praise for "This Is How a Garden Grows". Praise for "This Is How a Garden Grows" was mirrored in Mixmag who made it a Tune of the Month writing "...having toured and performed with Grace Jones, The Cinematic Orchestra. Writing for Uncut, John Lewis praised Eska escaping of her influences saying, "so distinctive and confessional is Eska's voice she's created a British pastoral music that defies classification". Writing for the Independent on Sunday, Howard Male said of the album, "Only a couple of times a decade does a new artist come along who so impresses that I find myself getting excited about what they’ll do next, even as I’m still assimilating their debut." In describing ESKA, Male calls the album "touching, powerful, experimental and sensuous – you could pick just about any positive adjective and it would apply," and in describing the individual tracks, the reviewer states that "each song here is both an independent entity of striking originality and a vital part of a truly cohesive album that is sure to be deemed a classic in decades to come."

Track listing

References

2015 debut albums
Eska (singer) albums